Marc Martínez may refer to:
 Marc Martínez (footballer, born 1986), Spanish footballer
 Marc Martínez (footballer, born 1990), Spanish footballer
 Marc Marzenit, born Marc Martínez, DJ and music producer

See also
 Mark Martinez, American college baseball coach